Warabe is the eighth original album by Japan-based Kodo.

Track listing
 陽気げん (Yokigen) - 4:40
 Bird Island - 2:53
 ころころ (Koro Koro) - 3:15
 いつかまた (Itsuka Mata) - 4:07
 蒼き風 (Ao-Ki Kaze)- 7:59
 魂結び (Tamamusubi) - 4:48
 青のゆくえ (Ao No Yukue) - 4:07
 びえい (Biei) - 4:40
 風天 (Fu-Ten) - 3:57
 もぐら (Mogura- Jungle Mole) - 4:08
 すべての心は (Subete No Kokoro Wa) - 4:58

1999 albums
Columbia Records albums